Xênia Érica Estrela França, also known as Xênia França (born 27 February 1986) is a Brazilian singer-songwriter from Candeias.

Biography and career 
França was born in Recôncavo Baiano, spent her teenage years in Camaçari. She would later move to São Paulo in 2004. While there, she would work as a model. In 2008, where she started singing in bars alongside her modelling. While working, she met Emicida, a Brazilian rap artist, who invited her to contribute to the production of his EP Sua Mina Ouve Meu Rep Tamém and his album Emicídio, (both released in 2010). The following year, she joined the band Aláfia, alongside artists Pipo Pegoraro and Lucas Cirillo.

In 2017, França released her first solo album, entitled Xenia. Her album would later be nominated for the 2018 Latin Grammy Awards in the category Best Contemporary Pop Album, alongside her track Pra Que Me Chamas? which would be nominated for Best Portuguese-Language Song.

In 2019, Xênia França became the first Brazilian artist to perform on the world-renowned COLORS YouTube channel.

In 2022, França released her first self-published album Em Nome Da Estrela, again collaborating with former members of Aláfia and Lourenco Rebetez.

Discography

Studio albums

With Aláfia 

 2017 – SP Não É Sopa (Agogô)
 2015 – Corpura (YB Music/Natura Musical)
 2013 – Aláfia (YB Music)

References 

Spanish-language singers of Brazil
Portuguese-language singers
Afro-Brazilian women singers
Contemporary R&B singers
1986 births
Living people
Women in Latin music